Kosmos 1109 ( meaning Cosmos 1109) was a Soviet US-K missile early warning satellite which was launched in 1979 as part of the Soviet military's Oko programme. The satellite was designed to identify missile launches using optical telescopes and infrared sensors.

Kosmos 1109 was launched from Site 41/1 at Plesetsk Cosmodrome in the Russian SSR. A Molniya-M carrier rocket with a 2BL upper stage was used to perform the launch, which took place at 18:11 UTC on 27 June 1979. The launch successfully placed the satellite into a molniya orbit. It subsequently received its Kosmos designation, and the international designator 1979-058A. The United States Space Command assigned it the Satellite Catalog Number 11417.

Podvig says that it self-destructed and that its orbit was never stabilised.

See also

 1979 in spaceflight
 List of Kosmos satellites (1001–1250)
 List of Oko satellites
 List of R-7 launches (1975-1979)

References

Kosmos satellites
1979 in spaceflight
Oko
Spacecraft launched by Molniya-M rockets
Spacecraft launched in 1979